Saidpur is a village in Sultanpur Lodhi Tehsil, Kapurthala district, Punjab, India, situated in the footsteps of Margalla Hills hardly at five minutes drive from the upscale neighbourhoods of the capital.

Bhai Jwala Singh Ragi: (1892–1952)
Bhai Sahib Bhai Jwala Singh Ragi of SaidPur, Kapurthala. 1935 at Dera Sahib, Lahore.
On the Jori is Bhai Gurcharan Singh and at about 10 years old is Bhai Avtar Singh playing the Taus. The handsome little boy is Bhai Rattan Singh, a gurbhai of Bhai Avtar Singh and a Tabla-Jori player who studied from Bhai Gurcharan Singh. Bhai Rattan Singh played Jori with Bhai Saheb Jwala Singh for the 9 days of kirtan when Mohandas Karam Chand (Mahatma) Gandhi died.

The pinnacle was his victory over the great legendary rababi Bhai Moti of Darbar Sahib Amritsar in the early 1900s. Bhai Santu played Jori with Bhai Moti and Bhai Harnam Singh of Thatha Tibba (a senior disciple of Ustad Bhai Harnam Singh of Jammu) played with him. But for the dual, they had to swap their pakhawajis to increase the level of difficulty. The competition went on for three days. He is one Kirtaniya whose name everyone took by touching their ears.

Bhai Kultar Singh Saidpur: a live wire between the new Sikh generation and the music of the first five gurus
Being the grandson of illustrious Bhai Jawala Singh ji of village Saidpur near the historic town of Sultanpur Lodhi, blessed by a long stay by Sri Guru Nanak Dev ji, and being the son of highly celebrated Late Bhai Avtar Singh ji former Huzoori Raagi of Gurdwara Sis Ganj Sahib of Old Delhi, Bhai Kultar Singh has several advantages as a "Gurbani Kirtania". His ancestors were associated with the "Guru Darbars" some four hundred years ago. As such they had a unique exposure to the prevalent traditions of "Gurbani Kirtan"in the "Guru Darbars". One of his predecessors had the privilege of serving in the "Guru Darbar" of the Tenth Master Sri Guru Guru Gobind Singh ji, as one of the several Kirtanias, while the Guru was in the Punjab.

Rubaru Restaurant 
The first fine dining restaurant in the area with full hygienic facility. Rubaru makes all type of Indian dishes and also has a big Chinese menu with famous worldwide dishes. It states at the main road of rcf to Goindwal sahib in the main entrance of Saidpur. If food is an experience then you will find it at this restaurant.

Famous People from Saidpur

 Baba Tehel Singh (also Bhai Panjab Singh; see Encyclopaedia of Sikhism, entry by Bhai Ardaman Singh Bagrian);
 Baba Dewa Singh (Diwan Singh, d.1884);
 Bhai Narain Singh (d.1906);
 Gyani Bhagat Singh;
 Bhai Avtar Singh and Bhai Gurcharan Singh Rāgi;
 Balwant Singh Thind (former Deputy-Chief Minister of Punjab, Ex Revenue/Finance Minister);
 Sardar Hardeep Singh PCS;
 Sardar Hardial Singh IAS;
 Amarjit Singh Thind, District Kapurthala Block Education Officer; 
 Avtar Singh Thind, I.R.S., (former Taxation Commissioner of India);
 Hardial Singh Thind, (former Session Judge, Punjab);
 Sukhdev Singh Thind, (Inspector General of Gujarat);
 Ravneet Kaur IAS;
 Principal Keval Singh, (Social worker, Philosopher);
 Amandeep Singh (PPLS) Additional District Attorney;
 Principal Lakhbir Singh (PES);
 Mr. Harjit Singh Thind M.Sc. Mathematics M.Ed.Lives in Canada

 Yuvraj Singh Thind IIT Bombay, IIM Ahemdabad;
 Bhai Baldeep Singh, The Anād Foundation;

Villages in Kapurthala district